Jonathan Stewart Vickers,  (October 29, 1926 – July 10, 2015), known professionally as Jon Vickers, was a Canadian heldentenor.

Born in Prince Albert, Saskatchewan, he was the sixth in a family of eight children. In 1950, he was awarded a scholarship to study opera at The Royal Conservatory of Music in Toronto. In 1957 Vickers joined London’s Royal Opera House, Covent Garden company. In 1960 he joined the Metropolitan Opera. He became world-famous for a wide range of German, French, and Italian roles. Vickers' huge, powerful voice and solid technique met the demands of many French, German, and Italian roles. He was also highly regarded for his powerful stage presence and thoughtful characterizations. (Conversely, he was sometimes criticized for "scooping"—beginning a note below pitch and then sliding up to the correct pitch—and for "crooning".)

In 1968 he was made a Companion of the Order of Canada. Vickers received the Governor General's Performing Arts Award for Lifetime Artistic Achievement, Canada's highest honour in the performing arts, in 1998.

Career
Vickers studied with George Lambert at The Royal Conservatory of Music and sang professionally in Canada from the early- to mid-1950s. His international career began with his 1957 Covent Garden Riccardo in Verdi's Un ballo in maschera. He continued to appear there into the 1980s, putting his personal stamp on the roles of Énée in Berlioz's Les Troyens, Radamès in Verdi's Aida and the title role in his Don Carlos, Handel's Samson, Florestan in Beethoven's Fidelio, Tristan in Wagner's Tristan und Isolde, Canio in Leoncavallo's Pagliacci, and the title role in Britten's Peter Grimes. Some critics praised Vickers' Tristan as the best since Lauritz Melchior's.

He debuted at the Bayreuth Festival in 1958 as Siegmund in Die Walküre and sang Parsifal there in 1964. Later negotiations with Wieland Wagner concerning appearances as Siegfried in Götterdämmerung ceased on Wieland's death in 1966. His debut role at the Metropolitan Opera in 1960 was Canio in Pagliacci. He appeared at the Met for a period of 27 years in 280 performances of 17 roles, including Florestan in Fidelio, Siegmund in Wagner's Die Walküre, Don Jose in Bizet's Carmen, Radamès in Aida, Erik in Wagner's Der fliegende Holländer, Herman in Tchaikovsky's Queen of Spades, Samson in both Handel's oratorio and Saint-Saëns' Samson et Dalila, the title role of Verdi's Otello, Don Alvaro in Verdi's La forza del destino, Peter Grimes, Tristan und Isolde, Laca in Janáček's Jenůfa, Vasek in Smetana's The Bartered Bride, and the title role in Wagner's Parsifal, giving his farewell in 1987.

Among Vickers' more notable recordings were Tristan und Isolde in 1972 with Herbert von Karajan becoming one of his favourite singers at the lavish Salzburg Easter and Summer Festivals in Der Ring des Nibelungen, Carmen, Otello, Fidelio as well as Tristan und Isolde, Les Troyens, singing the part of Énée (Aeneas), with Sir Colin Davis in 1969, and a legendary and controversial 1959 recording of Handel's Messiah with Sir Thomas Beecham.

Although scheduled to sing Tannhäuser at Covent Garden in the late 1970s, Vickers dropped out, claiming he could not empathize with the character, and that the opera itself was blasphemous in nature. He sang Nerone in Monteverdi's L'incoronazione di Poppea at the Paris Opéra, and Alvaro in La forza del destino at the Met (1975). His roles also included Don Carlos, Andrea Chenier, Herod in Salome, Giasone in Medea (with Maria Callas in the title role), Pollione in Norma and rarely heard parts such as Cellini in Berlioz's Benvenuto Cellini, Ratan-Sen in Roussel's Padmavati and Sergei in Shostakovitch's Lady Macbeth of the Mtsensk District. Many critics praised his interpretation of Verdi's Otello, which he recorded twice: in 1960 with Tullio Serafin and 1973 with Herbert von Karajan. Vickers also was a long time collaborator with American pianist Richard Woitach.

Vickers further sang at the 'home' of Italian opera, Milan's La Scala, as well as in the major opera houses of Chicago, San Francisco, Vienna, and at the Salzburg Festival. He retired in 1988.

Personal life and death
Vickers was born into the musical family of William, a teacher and school principal, and Myrle (née Mossop). As a youth he sang in his father's church, and his initial intention was to study medicine. He worked on a neighbour's farm and acquired the muscular stature that characterized him. During a semi-professional production his leading lady made a recording of his voice and sent it to The Royal Conservatory of Music in Toronto. He auditioned there with Every Valley Shall be Exalted and was offered a scholarship.

In 1953 he married Henrietta (Hetti) Outerbridge. They had five children. After her death in 1991, he married Judith Stewart. Vickers died of Alzheimer's disease on July 10, 2015 in Ontario.

Religion
He was a dedicated, outspoken Christian; one writer referred to him as "God's tenor" for this reason.

Discography
Vickers' voice was recorded in dozens of performances, including:

Opera recordings
 Aeneas in Berlioz's Les Troyens, with conductor Rafael Kubelik, live recording from the Royal Opera, Coven Garden in 1957
 Giasone in Cherubini's Medea, with conductor Nicola Rescigno, live recording from Dallas Civic Opera 1958.
 Don Carlo in Verdi's Don Carlos, with conductor Carlo Maria Giulini, live recording from the Royal Opera House, Covent Garden 1958.
 Siegmund in Wagner's Die Walküre, with conductor Hans Knappertsbusch, live recording from the Bayreuth Festival 1958.
 Samson in Handel's Samson, with conductor Raymond Leppard, live recording from the Royal Opera House, Covent Garden 1959.
 Otello in Verdi's Otello, with conductor Tullio Serafin, RCA Victor 1960.
 Siegmund in Wagner's Die Walküre, with conductor Erich Leinsdorf, Decca 1961.
 Radames in Verdi's Aida, with conductor Sir Georg Solti, Decca 1961.
 Florestan in Beethoven's Fidelio, with conductor Otto Klemperer, EMI 1961.
 Samson in Saint-Saëns' Samson and Delilah, with conductor Georges Prêtre, EMI 1962.
 Gustavo III in Verdi's Un ballo in maschera, with conductor Edward Downes, live recording from the Royal Opera House, Covent Garden 1962.
 Parsifal in Wagner's Parsifal, with conductor Hans Knappertsbusch, live recording from the Bayreuth Festival 1964.
 Siegmund in Wagner's Die Walküre, with conductor Herbert von Karajan, Deutsche Grammophon 1966.
 Énée in Berlioz's Les Troyens, with conductor Colin Davis, Philips 1969.
 Don José in Bizet's Carmen, with conductor Rafael Frühbeck de Burgos, EMI 1969–70.
 Florestan in Beethoven's Fidelio, with conductor Herbert von Karajan, EMI 1970.
 Tristan in Wagner's Tristan und Isolde, with conductor Herbert von Karajan, EMI 1971–72.
 Otello in Verdi's Otello, with conductor Herbert von Karajan, EMI 1973.
 Pollione in Bellini's Norma, with conductor Giuseppe Patanè, live recording from the Festival d'Orange 1974.
 Cellini in Berlioz's Benvenuto Cellini, with conductor Sarah Caldwell, VAI 1975.
 Grimes in Britten's Peter Grimes, with conductor Colin Davis, Philips 1978.

Concert recordings
 Elgar: The Dream of Gerontius, with conductor Sir John Barbirolli, live recording Rome 1957
 Handel: Messiah, with conductor Sir Thomas Beecham, RCA Victor 1959
 Vaughan Williams: Serenade to Music, with conductor Leonard Bernstein, live recording from the Lincoln Center NY 1962
 Verdi: Requiem, with conductor Sir John Barbirolli, EMI 1969–70
 Mahler: Das Lied von der Erde, with conductor Sir Colin Davis, Philips 1981
 Beethoven: Symphony No. 9, "Choral", with conductor Zubin Mehta, RCA Red Seal 1984.

Recital recordings
 Italian Opera Arias: Arias by Cilea, Flotow, Giordano, Leoncavallo, Ponchielli, Puccini and Verdi, with conductor Tullio Serafin, RCA Victor 1961.
 Franz Schubert: Winterreise with pianist Geoffrey Parsons, EMI 1983.
 Franz Schubert: Winterreise with pianist Peter Schaaf, VAI 1995.
 Richard Strauss: Enoch Arden, Op. 38, with pianist Marc-André Hamelin, VAI 2006.

References

Bibliography
 Kuhn, Laura (ed.). "Vickers, Jon(athan) Stewart" in Baker's Student Encyclopedia of Music: R-Z, p. 1952. Schirmer Books, 1999. 
 Macdonnell, W.M. and Norman, Barbara. "Vickers, Jonathan Stewart". The Canadian Encyclopedia
 Jon Vickers: A Hero's Life by Jeannie Williams, Northeastern University Press, 1999.

External links
 Interview with Jon Vickers by Bruce Duffie (originally published 1981 in Wagner News, the newsletter of the Wagner Society of America)
 Jon Vickers wagneropera.net
 
 On YouTube as Otello
 Singing MESSIAH (YouTube)
 Siegmund in DIE WALKURE

1926 births
2015 deaths
20th-century Canadian male opera singers
Canadian operatic tenors
Heldentenors
Companions of the Order of Canada
Musicians from Saskatchewan
People from Prince Albert, Saskatchewan
The Royal Conservatory of Music alumni
Honorary Members of the Royal Academy of Music
Governor General's Performing Arts Award winners
Neurological disease deaths in Ontario
Deaths from Alzheimer's disease